The official title of ISO 13584 is Industrial automation systems and integration - Parts library, with the acronym PLIB. PLIB is developed and maintained by the ISO technical committee TC 184, Technical Industrial automation systems and integration, sub-committee SC4 Industrial data. See also ISO 10303.

PLIB consists of these parts:
 ISO 13584-1, Overview and fundamental principles: Overview and fundamental principles
 Logical resources
 ISO 13584-20, Logical model of expressions
 ISO 13584-24, Logical model of a supplier library
 ISO 13584-25, Logical model of supplier library with aggregate values and explicit content
 ISO 13584-26, Information supplier identification
 Implementation resources
 ISO 13584-31, Geometric programming interface. This part defines a Fortran API for the creation of product geometry. It is derived from the German VDA API DIN 66304
 ISO 13584-32, Implementation resources: OntoML: Ontology Markup Language. This part  specifies an XML based exchange structure of ISO 13584-25 compliant data. It provides for exchanging: (1) ontologies/reference dictionaries compliant with the common ISO13584/IEC61360 dictionary model, and (2) libraries of product compliant with ISO13584-25.
 ISO 13584-35, Implementation resources: Spreadsheet interface for parts library. This part  specifies a spreadsheet based exchange structure of ISO 13584-25 compliant data.
 Description methodology
 ISO 13584-42, Methodology for structuring part families
 Others
 ISO 13584-101, Geometrical view exchange protocol by parametric program
 ISO 13584-102, View exchange protocol by ISO 10303 conforming specification
 ISO 13584-501, Reference dictionary for measuring instruments -- Registration procedure
 ISO 13584-511, Mechanical systems and components for general use -- Reference dictionary for fasteners

PLIB and IEC 61360 Component Data Dictionary are using the same datamodel.

External links
 PLIB home page
 IEC 61360 - Component Data Dictionary
 STEP File Analyzer and Viewer

13584